The Romanians Dowry (: Zestrea Românilor),  is a Romanian Television documentary serial dedicated to the traditional culture and civilization of  Romanian people.

References

Romanian Television